Nike Borzov (born Nikolai Vladimirovitch Barashko, ; 23 May 1972 in Vidnoe, Moscow region) is a Russian singer and musician.

Borzov gained major popularity in 2000 after the popularity of the songs "Tri Slova" [Three Words] and "Loshadka" [Little Horse] (which was censored by some Russian radio stations due to the use of the word cocaine).

Biography 
At the age of 14, Nike organized a punk band Infection, which existed until 1992. The band recorded two full-length studio albums Masturbation in 1990 and Hole for the Navel in 1992.

In parallel, Nike took an active part in various projects (Mesopotamia, Platonic Prostitution, Buufet, Died, Special Nurses, Norman Bates Fan Club and others), and also spoke with Khui zabey. He served two years in the army: "I have not learned anything during this time, I have never even fired from an automatic machine, although I went with him in an outfit, I knew how to assemble and disassemble".

He became more popular he left Infection, changing his style from punk to psychedelic rock.

In 1995, the magazine New Hot Rock described his work: "He sings extremely emotional and romantic songs of a kilometer length, burdened with arranging beauties, but generally inclined to the hysterical-melancholic stylistics The Cure. The core of the group is Nike himself and his drummer Lev Kostandian. One of the main hits is the eleven-minute hymn "Madness, Deceit and Little Piece of Love".

In 1997, along with the release of the album Puzzle, the song "The Horse" hit the rotation of the radio stations, provoking the public's anticipated interest and heated discussions.  According to the plot of the composition, a small horse carries cocaine. In his own comments, the musician explains the meaning of the song: "A person drives himself into certain frames, thinks out a certain order of things, which later can not change. He has responsibilities: a family that needs to be supported, work that you need to go to support a family, a dacha on which you need to do something every week, a car in which you have to pick one to go to that very dacha, etc. A man is a work horse, a horse man, a cart carrying his own happiness, a horse carrying cocaine." After several bans on the air, the word cocaine was replaced with different sounds and other words, for example clay, niacoc (cocaine on the contrary), which again was a win-win producer's move, as it attracted even more unhealthy interest of the public to "forbidden" and now encrypted topics. According to Nike, the song was written during the service in the army and "was dictated by the circumstances in which I existed there." Nike claims that he did not try cocaine, but instead prefers sports and fishing. "I just used a word that I liked. It was possible to use any other "ines" in the song, but, in my opinion, cocaine fits better". In 2000, his fourth studio album, Superman was released. 

After a fairly successful album Splinter, released in 2002, the singer for a few years fell silent, devoting himself to the family and various outside projects. For example, in 2003 he performed the main role in the play "Nirvana" Yuri Grymov, where he played Kurt Cobain. 

In January 2008, the musician presented to the public the song "Wind", a fast melodic songs with a dark romantic lyrics, which Abanin Michael was immediately removed the video. The video got into the rotation of the TV channel "A-One", The Internet version of the video soon appeared on the website of the magazine Poster. In November 2008, he finished recording the original soundtrack to the audiobook of Hunter S. Thompson's Fear and Loathing in Las Vegas: A Savage Journey to the Heart of the American Dream, which he himself had announced in tandem with Arkhip Ahmeleevym.

Discography 

 Погружение [Pogruzheniye] (Submergence) (1992)
 Закрыто [Zakryto] (Closed) (1994)
 Головоломка [Golovolomka] (Puzzle) (1997)
 Супермен [Supermen] (Superman) (2000)
 Лошадка [Loshadka] (maxi-single, 2000)
 СупермEND [SupermEND] (2000)
 NUS in Am (2001)
 Заноза [Zanoza] (Splinter) (2002)
 Ради Любви [Radi Lyubvi] (For the Sake of Love) (2004)
 DVD 10 (1999–2003 clips compilation, 2005)
 Изнутри [Iznutri] (Internally) (2010)
 Радоваться [Radovatsya] (single) (Joy) (2010)
 Кислотный бог [Kislotniy bog] (Acid God) (2018)
 Капля крови создателя [Kaplya krovi sozdatelya] (A drop of the Creator's blood) (2020)

See also
 MTV Russian Music Awards

References

1972 births
Living people
21st-century Russian singers
21st-century Russian male singers